The 2002 WGC-Accenture Match Play Championship was a golf tournament that was played from February 20–24, 2002 at La Costa Resort and Spa in Carlsbad, California. It was the fourth WGC-Accenture Match Play Championship and the first of four World Golf Championships events held in 2002.

Kevin Sutherland won his first and only World Golf Championships event by defeating Scott McCarron 1 up in the 36 hole final. It was also the only PGA Tour win for Sutherland.

Brackets
The Championship was a single elimination match play event. The field consisted of the top 64 players available from the Official World Golf Rankings, seeded according to the rankings. José Cóceres (ranked 23) withdrew  because he was recovering from a broken arm and Thomas Bjørn (ranked 24) withdrew to rest an injured shoulder. They were replaced by John Cook (ranked 65) and Peter O'Malley (ranked 66).

Bobby Jones bracket

Ben Hogan bracket

Gary Player bracket

Sam Snead bracket

Final Four

Breakdown by country

Prize money breakdown

References

External links
 Bracket PDF source
 About the matches

WGC Match Play
Golf in California
Carlsbad, California
Sports competitions in San Diego County, California
WGC-Accenture Match Play Championship
WGC-Accenture Match Play Championship
WGC-Accenture Match Play Championship